Jorge Carlos Obregón Serrano (born 9 April 1956) is a Mexican politician affiliated with the National Action Party. As of 2014 he served as Deputy of the LIX Legislature of the Mexican Congress representing Guanajuato. He also served as Municipal President of León from 1998 to 2000.

References

1956 births
Living people
Politicians from Guanajuato
People from León, Guanajuato
National Action Party (Mexico) politicians
Municipal presidents in Guanajuato
20th-century Mexican politicians
21st-century Mexican politicians
Universidad de Guanajuato alumni
Deputies of the LIX Legislature of Mexico
Members of the Chamber of Deputies (Mexico) for Guanajuato